Kraten is a harbour town on the northern edge of the Kerkennah Islands of Tunisia. It is known for octopus fishing.

Tunisian revolution
The fishermen of Kraten partook in rescue operations for illegal immigrants to Europe (chiefly via Italy) whose boats failed to make the crossing in the aftermath of the Tunisian revolution in January 2011.

References

Populated places in Tunisia